Shanghailanders were foreignprincipally European and Americansettlers in the extraterritorial areas of Shanghai, China, between the 1842 Treaty of Nanjing and the mid-20th century.

Overview
Originally privileged by the "Unequal Treaties" and housed in the International Settlement and French Concession away from the Chinese city in the 1800s, they lost most of their status during and after the Japanese occupation of Shanghai in World War II. A 1943 Sino-British Friendship Treaty abandoned the treaty port system, and by this time most American, British, and Dutch Shanghailanders had been deported to concentration camps by the Japanese.

The concessions' extraterritorial zones proved a haven, however, to refugee Jews lacking visas. World War II saw a community of about 18,000 develop, principally from Germany and Austria. After World War II, the majority moved on to the United States or Israel. See History of the Jews in China for more.

Famous Shanghailanders
Werner Michael Blumenthal
Ayya Khema
Jakob Rosenfeld
Franziska Tausig
Margot Fonteyn
J. G. Ballard
Walter Henry Medhurst

See also
 Shanghai ghetto

Notes

References

Bickers, Robert (1998). Shanghailanders: The Formation and Identity of the British Settler Community in Shanghai 1843-1937. In: Past and Present.
Journal of Modern Asian Studies 30, 2 (1996), Death of a Young Shanghailander: The Thorburn Case and the Defence of the British Treaty Ports in China in 1931. R. A. Bickers. (pp. 271–300.)

American diaspora in Asia
European diaspora in China
History of Shanghai
Shanghailander
Shanghailander
1842 establishments in China
Shanghai International Settlement